Georges Kan (born in 1958) is a French musicologist, music publisher and composer. Kan has written several articles, notably for the series "À la ligne" of the ensemble 2e2m. His research also concerns the link between music and literature: he suggests Brahms' Violin Sonata No. 2 as a possible model for the Vinteuil Sonata.

Born in Enghien-les-Bains, Kan studied music at the Limoges Conservatory, then at the Rubin Academy of Tel-Aviv-Jaffa, in Walter Aufhauser's piano class.

Publisher 

Musicology, writings, compositions 
In 2008, impressed by the quality of the publications of the Artaria publishing house in Vienna (1796), he embarked on a pre-romantic reconstitution of Beethoven's piano sonatas. He published research on the opus 2 and opus 7.

In particular, he proposes a link between Beethoven's Piano Sonata No. 22 and the Battle of Valmy.

His recent research on Bach's The Well-Tempered Clavier directs him towards a new analysis of the cover page graphics of the manuscript leading to a possible link to the Book of Genesis.

Kan is also the author/translator of musical notices (Spur by Johannes Schöllhorn, Ça sonne by Bernard Cavanna) and the composer of educational works (Sept Études sur les intervalles for piano, two pieces (Ondée and Romance) for clarinet and piano).

His Piano Concert premiered in 1989 at the Salle Cortot by Martine Vialatte and the Ensemble orchestral d'Île-de-France, Bruno de Saint-Maurice conducting, and has been available on CD since 2015.

In 1999, he also launched a manifesto, with the support of 250 artists, on the programming of France Musique, expressing concern about the development of this radio station: "Everything concerning musicological knowledge, the diffusion of Baroque music, the encouragement of young talents, the discovery of traditional music and finally contemporary creation, everything has evaporated." , then director of that radio station, stayed the course and replied that the station could not be confiscated by specialists, musicologists and academics, and that the idea was to make this musical programme available to a wide audience.

References 

1958 births
Living people
People from Enghien-les-Bains
20th-century French musicologists
21st-century French musicologists
French music publishers (people)
20th-century classical composers
21st-century classical composers